Now That's What I Call Music!, also referred to as Now or Now 1, was released on July 20, 1995. Modeled after the highly successful Now That's What I Call Music! series in the United Kingdom, which compiles a number of songs that are popular around the time of its release, this album is the first edition of the Now! series in the South Asia. It sold more than a Million copies in Japan.

South Asia edition track Listing

Singapore edition track listing

Sales and certifications

References

External links
 Now That's What I Call Music! Asia Track List
 Now That's What I Call Music! Indonesia Track List

1995 compilation albums
Now That's What I Call Music! albums (Asian series)
1995 debut albums
Virgin Records compilation albums